Yngvar Sigurd Heikel (19 April 1889 – 1 September 1956) was a Finland-Swedish ethnologist.

Life and work 
Heikel was born in Helsinki, Finland in 1889 to gymnastics teacher Viktor Heikel. Among his family are aunt and uncle Anna and Felix Heikel and grandfather Henrik Heikel.

He graduated with a degree in philosophy in 1915 and was a statistician at the Bank of Finland from 1921 to 1924 and from 1935. However, he is best known for his research on folk culture in Swedish-speaking Finland, especially on folk dances and folk costumes. Heikel sampled and categorized each village's form of folk costume. His work was also the main initiator of the founding of the Brage Costume Museum. He also charted the connection between living conditions and disease in different areas.

He participated in the founding of the Finland Swedish Folk Dance Association and was its president from 1946 to 1955.

Heikel died in Helsinki in 1956.

Bibliography

References

External links 

1889 births
1956 deaths
People from Helsinki
20th-century Finnish people
Finnish ethnologists
Swedish-speaking Finns